Burma VJ: Reporting from a Closed Country is a 2008 Danish documentary film directed by Anders Østergaard. It follows the Saffron Revolution against the military regime in Burma. The "VJ" in the title stands for "video journalists." Some of it was filmed on hand-held cameras. The footage was smuggled out of the country, physically or over the Internet. Other parts of it were reconstructed, which caused controversy.

Reception

Critical response 
Burma VJ has an approval rating of 97% on review aggregator website Rotten Tomatoes, based on 62 reviews, and an average rating of 7.69/10. The website's critical consensus states, "A powerfully visceral docu-drama highlighting the evils of censorship and the essential need for freedom of speech". It also has a score of 82 out of 100 on Metacritic, based on 13 critics, indicating "universal acclaim".

Awards and nominations 

The film won awards, especially at European film festivals, e.g. it won the Golden Apricot at the 2009 Yerevan International Film Festival, Armenia, for Best Documentary Film. It won the World Cinema Documentary Film Editing Award at the Sundance Film Festival. Burma VJ was also nominated for an Academy Award for Best Documentary Feature.

Box office 
The film was released to one theater on 20 May 2009 and grossed $5,554 in the opening weekend. Its widest release was in three theaters. As of 1 May 2010, the total gross stands at $123,477.

DVD features 
The DVD includes a message from Buddhist actor Richard Gere comparing the situation in Burma to that in Tibet.

See also 

 8888 Uprising
 Human rights in Burma
 Saffron Revolution
 The Lady

References

External links 
 
 
 
 Burma VJ at Rotten Tomatoes
 Sundance 2009 page

2008 documentary films
2008 films
Best Documentary Bodil Award winners
Best Documentary Robert Award winners
Burmese democracy movements
Burmese documentary films
Danish documentary films
Documentary films about revolutions
Films set in Myanmar